Angelos Giallinas (Greek: Άγγελος Γιαλλινάς; 5 March 1857, Corfu - 1939, Corfu) was a Greek landscape painter, known primarily for his watercolors. He was one of the last representatives of the Heptanese School of art.

Biography
From 1872 to 1875, he studied at the private art school of Charalambos Pachis, then continued his studies in Venice, Naples and Rome. During this time, he decided to devote himself to watercolors. He returned to Corfu in 1878.

He soon began participating in the "Panhellenic Exhibitions"" in Athens and presented his first solo showing in 1886. It was there that he met the British Ambassador, Clare Ford, who commissioned him to paint albums of landscapes from Venice, Spain, Rhodes and Istanbul. Ford also arranged an exhibit in London, which ran from 1891 to 1892, and introduced Giallinas to the British nobility.

He also participated in the Exposition Universelle (1900). Two years later, he started his own private art school on Corfu. From 1907 to 1908, he painted murals at the Achilleion, a palace built by Empress Elisabeth of Austria. His largest exhibition came in 1918 at the "Galerie D’Art Geo" in Athens. A major retrospective of his work was held at the National Gallery of Greece in 1974.

His home became an art gallery. In 2010, several paintings were stolen and have not been recovered.

Gallery 
The following images are watercolour paintings by Angelos Giallinas, printed in three colour lithography by Aspiotis, Greece.

References

Further reading
Aeron Charline, Angelos Giallinas, Onym Press, 2011

External links

ArtNet: More works by Giallinas
"Ποιοι πίνακες εκλάπησαν από την οικία Γιαλλινά" (Which paintings were stolen from the Giallinas House) @ Το Βημα

1857 births
1939 deaths
Artists from Corfu
Greek landscape painters
Greek watercolourists
19th-century Greek painters
20th-century Greek painters
Painters of the Heptanese School